Entre Ríos - Rodolfo Walsh is a station on Line E of the Buenos Aires Underground. The station was opened on 20 June 1944 as part of the inaugural section of the line from San José to General Urquiza.

References

External links

Buenos Aires Underground stations